10 non ODI warmup games for the 2014 Cricket World Cup Qualifier were played before the tournament started.

World Cup Qualifier
World Cup Qualifier
World Cup Qualifier
2013 Cup Qualifier
ICC World Cup Qualifier
Cricket World Cup Qualifier
January 2014 sports events in New Zealand